Dmitry Savelyev (born August 3, 1968, Gorky) is a Russian political figure, deputy of the 3rd, 4th, 5th, and 6th State Dumas.

Savelyev served in the Soviet–Afghan War. After that, he worked as general manager of the Lukoil Ufa. From 1996 to 1997, he was the vice president of the Norse Oil OJSC. On March 29, 1998, he was elected deputy of the Legislative Assembly of Nizhny Novgorod Oblast of the 2nd convocation. From 1998 to 1999, he was the president of the Transneft. In 1999, he was elected deputy of the 3rd State Duma from the Nizhny Novgorod Oblast constituency. In 2003, 2007, and 2011, he was re-elected for the 4th, 5th, 6th, respectively. In 2016, he became a member of the Federation Council.

In 2021, Savelyev took 38th place in the Forbes ranking of the wealthiest Russian civil servants. He moved up on 47 positions compared to the similar ranking that took place in 2020, where he occupied 85th place.

Awards  

 Order of Alexander Nevsky
 Order of Honour (Russia)
 Medal "For Courage" (Russia)
 Order "For Merit to the Fatherland"

References

1968 births
Living people
United Russia politicians
21st-century Russian politicians
Sixth convocation members of the State Duma (Russian Federation)
Fifth convocation members of the State Duma (Russian Federation)
Fourth convocation members of the State Duma (Russian Federation)
Third convocation members of the State Duma (Russian Federation)
Members of the Federation Council of Russia (after 2000)
Russian Presidential Academy of National Economy and Public Administration alumni